The 1980 Grand Prix motorcycle racing season was the 32nd F.I.M. Road Racing World Championship season.

Season summary
Yamaha's Kenny Roberts claimed his third successive 500cc world championship in a season shortened by the cancellations of the Venezuelan and Austrian rounds. Randy Mamola took over at Suzuki from Barry Sheene. Kawasaki returned to the 500cc class with a monocoque, four cylinder bike for Kork Ballington. Honda soldiered on with its exotic four-stroke NR500 but began to realize it was at a disadvantage against its two-stroke opposition.

There were only six rounds in the 350cc class that saw South Africa's Jon Ekerold, a true privateer, take the championship from the Kawasaki factory-sponsored Anton Mang. Mang would take the 250cc crown from defending champion Ballington while Pier Paolo Bianchi won the 125cc title. Eugenio Lazzarini won a tight battle from Swiss Stefan Dörflinger to take the 50cc championship by only 2 points.

1980 Grand Prix season calendar
The following Grands Prix were scheduled to take place in 1980:

Calendar changes
 The Venezuelan and Swedish Grand Prix was taken off the calendar due to financial problems.
 The Austrian Grand Prix, originally scheduled for April, was eventually cancelled due to snowy conditions on race week. It was the last Grand Prix to have all races cancelled until the 2018 British Grand Prix (although all free practices and qualifying took place).
 The German Grand Prix had its date moved from 6 May to 24 August and the venue was moved from the Hockenheimring to the Nürburgring-Nordschleife.
 The French Grand Prix had its date moved from 2 September to 25 May and the venue was moved from the Bugatti Circuit in Le Mans to the Circuit Paul Ricard.
 The Belgian Grand Prix moved from the Circuit de Spa-Francorchamps to the Circuit Zolder due to problems with the new track last year.

Results and standings

1980 Grand Prix season results

Participants

500cc participants

Notes

 * The 500cc did not participate in rounds 4 and 9 of the championship, the Yugoslav and Czechoslovak GPs.
 ** Katayama raced with the Suzuki for the first four races until the Honda was ready.
 *** Ballington missed some races due to an injury.
 **** Pons was killed in a racing accident at the British GP.

500cc riders' standings
Scoring system
Points are awarded to the top ten finishers. A rider has to finish the race to earn points.

350cc standings

250cc standings

125cc standings

50cc standings

References
 Büla, Maurice & Schertenleib, Jean-Claude (2001). Continental Circus 1949-2000. Chronosports S.A. 

Grand Prix motorcycle racing seasons
Grand Prix motorcycle racing season